Sylviane may refer to:

Sylviane Agacinski (born 1945), French philosopher, author, professor, wife of Lionel Jospin
Sylviane Berthod (born 1977), female alpine skier from Switzerland
Sylviane Deferne, Swiss pianist and musician
Sylviane Diouf, historian and writer of Franco-Senegalese origin
Sylviane Félix (born 1977), track and field sprint athlete, Olympic medallist for France
Sylviane Puntous, Canadian former triathlete who won the Hawaii Ironman Triathlon in 1983 and 1984